Daleks Among Us is a Big Finish Productions audio drama based on the long-running British science fiction television series Doctor Who.

Plot

Cast
The Doctor – Sylvester McCoy
Klein – Tracey Childs
Davros – Terry Molloy
Will Arrowsmith – Christian Edwards
Hinterberger – Jonathan Forbes
Dalek Voices / Ralf / Workman – Nicholas Briggs
Falkus/Wraith #1 – Tim Delap
Qaren/Wraith #2 – Jessica Brooks
The Shepherd – Paul Chahidi

External links
Big Finish Productions – Daleks Among Us
DiscContinuity Guide entry for Daleks Among Us

Reviews
Daleks Among Us reviews at Sci-Fi Bulletin
Daleks Among Us reviews at Timelash

2013 audio plays
Seventh Doctor audio plays
Davros audio plays
Dalek audio plays